Rosalind Jane Brett (born 12 March 1979) is an English former competition swimmer.

Swimming career
She represented Great Britain in the Olympics, FINA world championships and European championships, and England in the Commonwealth Games, winning seven medals in freestyle and medley relay events in international competition.

Brett represented Great Britain at the 2000 and 2004 Olympic Games in the relay events.  She represented England at the 2002 and 2006 Commonwealth Games, winning silver medals on both occasions in the women's 4×100-metre freestyle relay.

She won the 1996 British Championship in 50 metres freestyle and was twice winner of the 100 metres freestyle (2001 and 2006).

See also
 List of British records in swimming

References

External links
 British Swimming athlete profile

1979 births
Living people
English female swimmers
English female freestyle swimmers
Olympic swimmers of Great Britain
Swimmers at the 2000 Summer Olympics
Swimmers at the 2002 Commonwealth Games
Swimmers at the 2004 Summer Olympics
Swimmers at the 2006 Commonwealth Games
World Aquatics Championships medalists in swimming
Commonwealth Games medallists in swimming
Commonwealth Games silver medallists for England
Sportspeople from King's Lynn
Medallists at the 2002 Commonwealth Games
Medallists at the 2006 Commonwealth Games